Simone Luiz (born ) is a Brazilian individual rhythmic gymnast. She represents her nation at international competitions. She competed at world championships, including at the 2011 World Rhythmic Gymnastics Championships.

References

1992 births
Living people
Brazilian rhythmic gymnasts
Place of birth missing (living people)